Barry Thorndycraft (October 29, 1933 – September 22, 2005)  was a Canadian ice hockey player and head coach most well known for his time at North Dakota where he won a National Title in 1963.

Career
Thorndycraft played junior and minor league hockey for several seasons in the 1950s, winning a Turner Cup with the Cincinnati Mohawks, before trying his hand at coaching. His first job behind the bench was as an assistant for North Dakota in the year they won their first national title. When head coach Bob May left the program in the offseason Thorndycraft was chosen to replace him. His first year was promising but the team had to suffer through two down seasons before breaking through with the program's second national title in 1963. Thorndycraft coached the team one more year before moving to Switzerland to continue his coaching career.

After he retired from coaching Thorndycraft went on to work for Texaco and also became a realtor. He died in the fall of 2005 after a short illness.

Head coaching record

References

External links

1933 births
2005 deaths
Canadian ice hockey coaches
Canadian ice hockey left wingers
Cincinnati Mohawks (IHL) players
Montreal Royals (QSHL) players
North Dakota Fighting Hawks men's ice hockey coaches
Ice hockey people from Winnipeg